Mamlyutka (Mamliut) is a town (till 1969 — village) that is the administrative center of Mamlyut District, North Kazakhstan Region, Kazakhstan.

There is a railway station on the Kurgan — Petropavlovsk line in the town.

1969 establishments in the Soviet Union
Populated places in North Kazakhstan Region